The 1988 Virginia Slims of Florida was a women's tennis tournament played on outdoor hard courts at the Boca Raton Resort & Club in Boca Raton, Florida in the United States and was part of Tier II of the 1988 WTA Tour. The tournament ran from March 7 through March 13, 1988. Fourth-seeded Gabriela Sabatini won the singles title and earned $60,000 first-prize money, ending a 30-match winning streak by Steffi Graf. It was Sabatini's first win over Graf after 11 previous defeats.

Finals

Singles

 Gabriela Sabatini defeated  Steffi Graf 2–6, 6–3, 6–1
 It was Sabatini's 1st singles title of the year and the 6th of her career.

Doubles

 Katrina Adams /  Zina Garrison defeated  Claudia Kohde-Kilsch /  Helena Suková 4–6, 7–5, 6–4
 It was Adams' 1st title of the year and the 2nd of her career. It was Garrison's 1st title of the year and the 12th of her career.

References

External links
 ITF tournament edition details

Virginia Slims of Florida
Virginia Slims of Florida
Virginia Slims of Florida
Virginia Slims of Florida
Virginia Slims of Florida